William Mong Man-wai GBS (7 November 1927 – 20 July 2010) was the chairman of the Shun Hing Group, the distributor of Matsushita products (National, Panasonic, Technics) in Hong Kong.

He attended La Salle College in Hong Kong. Mong Man-wai died from cancer on 20 July 2010, aged 82. Many buildings in Hong Kong universities are named after him.

References

1927 births
2010 deaths
Deaths from cancer in Hong Kong
Hong Kong businesspeople
Hong Kong philanthropists
Hong Kong Basic Law Consultative Committee members
Place of birth missing
20th-century philanthropists